The 2021–22 season was Al-Ettifaq's 43rd non-consecutive season in the Pro League and their 76th season in existence. The club participated in the Pro League and the King Cup.

The season covered the period from 1 July 2021 to 30 June 2022.

Players

Squad information

Out on loan

Transfers and loans

Transfers in

Transfers out

Loans out

Pre-season

Competitions

Overview

Goalscorers

Last Updated: 27 June 2022

Assists

Last Updated: 27 June 2022

Clean sheets

Last Updated: 27 June 2022

References

Ettifaq FC seasons
Ettifaq